Anatoly (Anatoli) Timofeevich Zverev  (November 3, 1931 Moscow –December 9, 1986 Moscow) was a Russian artist, a member of the non-conformist movement and a founder of Russian Expressionism in the 1960s. He spent all of his life in Moscow.

He did not have a solo show in Russia until shortly before his death in 1986 and his work was exhibited in small, underground galleries. Throughout his career he was harassed and persecuted by the Soviet authorities especially as his international success grew.

Work
His style of tachisme can be compared with the work of the American Abstract Expressionist painter Jackson Pollock. His work was based on deep philosophical convictions, particularly the idea of momentalism, that everything is in constant change. His intention was to render direct sensations, and he worked at great speed.

Early life
Zverev was born in Moscow.  His grandfather was an icon painter. His father was a war invalid and died when Tolya was a little boy. His mother, a cleaner and manual labourer, brought up the family of three children on her own. Throughout Zverev's childhood the family endured extreme poverty. For example, he was sent to school wearing unmatching shoes. In order to bring more money into the family he took a job at a recreation park, painting fences and boards. It was there that he started to paint images from fairy tales.

International success and persecution at home

An art-lover called Rumnev noticed his work and introduced him to the famous art collector George Costakis. Costakis later said that Anatoly was "one of the most talented artists in Soviet Russia... a unique phenomenon". Costakis brought his work to the attention of the West. He was fired from the recreational park because the director saw him using a mop for his paintings "against the regulations".

A Zverev self-portrait was featured in the March 28, 1960 issue of LIFE beside a portrait of Vladimir Lenin by the Soviet artist Vladimir Serov  (1910-1968) to contrast the underground with the official art of Russia. When Nikita Khrushchev learned about the publication he was outraged and forbade all contacts with Western visitors and closed down all semi-legal exhibitions. Zverev was the main target of his outrage, forcing him into hiding. From time to time he disappeared and the rumours of his death began to spread about Moscow.  Each time the rumours were not justified.  "They have stumbled on me again" he used to say. He never complained and made jokes: "I am not a communist, I am a harmonist."

As a result of his persecution at the hands of the authorities, he surrounded himself with a small group of friends who would be able to support him. He lived a hand-to-mouth existence, never knowing where he would spend the next night. He was indifferent to material values and always wore shabby clothing.

Personality
Zverev was not easy to get to know.  His language was metaphorical, his manner was sometimes provocative and he suffered from mental instability. However, he was also a serious thinker and observer. Those in his circle used to say, "When the Lord anointed us artists for our profession, He poured a whole cup of oil on Tolya's head".

Death
Thousands and thousands gathered at his funeral in 1986 to pay their last respects. After his death there was a major retrospective exhibition for several months in the major art museum of Moscow. The exhibition had to be extended as people were queuing up to get inside around the clock.

Exhibitions and collectors
Since 1957, Zverev participated in over eighty group exhibitions in museums and galleries around the world.  His work are in many prominent collections in Russia, Europe and United States.

References

External links
 Kolodzei Collection of Russian and Eastern European Art, Kolodzei Art Foundation 
 Art4.ru Contemporary Art Museum 
 Anatoly Zverev in ArtPanorama Gallery, Moscow, Russia. www.artpanorama.su

Other sources
 Hurricane of Time: 1960-2000, Selection from the Kolodzei Collection of Russian and Eastern European Art. SanRemo, Italy. Exhibition catalogue. 
 The George Costakis Collection. "Russian Avant-Garde Art". New York: Harry N. Abrams, Inc. . 1981
 "Anatoly Zverev". Koursos Gallery , New York. 1986
 "Anatoly Zverev. Painting, Drawing". P.S. Moscow. 1991. .
 "Анатолий Зверев". Н. Г. Григорьева. Издательство "Знание". 1991
 "Анатолий Зверев. Современники о художнике". Фонд имени М. Ю. Лермонтова. Moscow. . 1995
 Excerpts from the presentation by Ann Messerer at Macquarie University, Sydney, July 1995
 "Zverev". The State Tretyakov Gallery, Kino Gallery, Moscow. Printed by RASTER'S, Moscow. 1999

1931 births
1986 deaths
20th-century Russian painters
Russian male painters
Soviet Nonconformist Art
20th-century Russian male artists